The Column of Phocas is a Roman monumental column in the Roman Forum of Rome, Italy, built when Rome was part of the Eastern Roman Empire after its reconquest from the Kingdom of the Ostrogoths.

History
Erected in front of the Rostra and dedicated or rededicated in honour of the Eastern Roman Emperor Phocas on August 1, 608 AD, it was the last addition made to the Forum Romanum. The fluted Corinthian column stands 13.6 m (44 ft) tall on its cubical white marble socle.  On stylistic grounds, the column seems to have been made in the 2nd century for an unknown structure, and then recycled for the present monument. Likewise, the socle was recycled from its original use supporting a statue dedicated to Diocletian; the former inscription was chiselled away to provide a space for the later text.

The base of the column was uncovered in 1813, and the inscription on it reads, in Latin:

The English translation is as follows:

The precise occasion for this signal honour is unknown, though Phocas had formally donated the Pantheon to Pope Boniface IV, who rededicated it to all the martyrs and Mary (Sancta Maria ad Martyres). Atop the column's capital was erected by Smaragdus, the Exarch of Ravenna, a "dazzling" gilded statue of Phocas (which probably only briefly stood there). Rather than a demonstration to mark papal gratitude as it is sometimes casually declared to be, the gilded statue on its column was more likely an emblem of the imperial sovereignty over Rome, which was rapidly fading under pressure from the Lombards, and a personal mark of gratitude from Smaragdus, who had been recalled by Phocas from a long exile and was indebted to the Emperor for retrieving his position of power at Ravenna.

In October 610, Phocas was overthrown and killed; his statues everywhere were overthrown.

The monument remains today in its original location (in situ). Its isolated, free-standing position among the ruins has always made it a landmark in the Forum, and it often appears in vedute and engravings. The rise in ground level due to silt and debris had completely buried the socle by the time Giuseppe Vasi and Giambattista Piranesi made engravings and etchings of the column in the mid-18th century.  The square foundation of brick (illustration, right) was not originally visible, the present level of the Forum not having been excavated down to its earlier Augustan paving until the 19th century.

See also
 
 Zygmunt's Column

References

External links
 René Seindal, "The Column of Phocas"
 Encyclopaedia Romana "Column of Phocas"
 The Column of Phocas, a novel by Sean Gabb.
 Christian Hülsen, 1906. The Roman Forum: Its History and Its Monuments IV. "The Column of Phocas"

Buildings and structures completed in 608
Phocas
Monumental columns in Rome
Rome R. X Campitelli